Ropkey Armor Museum (today, known as the Ropkey Armor and Aviation Museum) is a military history museum in Indianapolis, Indiana.

History
The museum is privately owned by the Ropkey family. It stemmed from the founder Fred Ropkey's interest in military history and his past career as a tank platoon leader in the U.S. Marine Corps during the early 1950s.

The Ropkey Armor Museum closed July 29, 2017. Afterwards, The vehicle collection was downsized. Some pieces of the collection were distributed to other museums while the core collection was relocated by the Ropkey's to Indianapolis, Indiana. The museum lives on today as the Ropkey Armor and Aviation Museum with renewed focus given to historic aircraft and aviation history.

Collection 
The museum collection consists of AFVs, soft skin vehicles, marine and aircraft.

Other exhibits are soft-skin military vehicles, aircraft and a Vietnam war-era PBR. The aircraft include an Antonov An-2 and the unique Bell X-14B. This aircraft was used for early research into VTOL until it was written off in a landing accident in 1981. It is currently being restored by the museum.

References 

Military and war museums in Indiana
Transportation museums in Indiana
Museums in Marion County, Indiana
Tank museums